S.O.B. Hill is a , summit in San Juan County, Utah, in the United States.

A trail for off-road vehicles passes over S.O.B. Hill and leads to a small public campground.

S.O.B. Hill has been noted for its unusual place name.

References

Mountains of San Juan County, Utah
Mountains of Utah